The Embassy of Libya in Washington, D.C. is the diplomatic mission of Libya to the United States. It is located at 1460 Dahlia Street NW Washington, DC 20012.

History
Currently, Khaled Daief is acting as chargé d'affaires of the Embassy of the State of Libya. Prior to August 2021, Wafa Bughaighis was ambassador.

The former ambassador is Ali Aujali.

As a result of the 2011 Libyan civil war, in March 2011, the U.S. suspended relations with the Libyan embassy in Washington, D.C.

In July 2011, at an international conference on Libya held in Turkey, Secretary of State Hillary Clinton stated that the US had decided to formally recognize the National Transitional Council as the country's "legitimate authority". In August 2011, the State Department approved plans to allow the National Transitional Council to re-open the Libyan embassy in Washington. The embassy officially re-opened on 12 August with Ali Aujali accredited as the head of the mission.

References

External links
Official website of the Libyan Embassy in Washington DC

Libya
Washington, D.C.
Libya–United States relations